Dan's Chocolates is a Burlington, Vermont  chocolate maker.

History
The company was founded in 1999 by Dan Cunningham. It was established as a subsidiary of the BlueMountain.com greeting card site and spun off as an independent venture in 2000.

The company operates both a factory direct boxed chocolates business as well as a business selling all-natural chocolate bars and truffles through retail grocery stores.

Dan's Chocolates comprises milk, dark, and white varieties.

Dan's Chocolates posts a social responsibility scorecard on its site, which includes measures to reduce energy use, greenhouse gas emissions, and waste products in manufacturing. Since its founding day, a percentage of each sale has been given to one of the charities which customers designate at checkout.

Dan's Chocolates became part of Hauser Foods in 2017.

References

External links
Dan's Chocolates

American chocolate companies
Companies based in Burlington, Vermont
Food and drink companies based in Vermont
1999 establishments in Vermont
American companies established in 1999